A Place Called Happy is a Nollywood movie that tells a story of two couples from Ghana and Nigeria respectively of which these couples have had some challenging times of the past years.

Cast
Sika Osei
Kiki Omeili
Mawuli Gavor

References

Nigerian drama films
English-language Nigerian films
English-language Ghanaian films
2015 films